Dalkhola High School is a schools for boys and girls in Dalkhola, West Bengal, India.

History
The school was established in 1947 as a Middle English School and upgraded to a High School in 1950 with six students in standard VIII. However, 1950 is officially considered as the year of establishment of Dalkhola High School though it had started its function 20 years earlier.

Affiliation
The school is affiliated to the West Bengal Council of Higher Secondary Education.
High schools and secondary schools in West Bengal

Educational institutions established in 1947
1947 establishments in India
Schools in Uttar Dinajpur district